The 2013 Coppa Italia Final was the final match of the 2012–13 Coppa Italia, the 66th season of the top cup competition in Italian football. The match was played at the Stadio Olimpico in Rome between Lazio and Roma on Sunday, 26 May 2013 at 18:00 CET. 

Lazio had played 7 Coppa Italia finals and Roma 16, but the two sides had never met each other in the final prior to this match. Since the final was always played at the Stadio Olimpico independent of which teams were going to play, it was the first Derby della Capitale in a Coppa Italia final, when both Rome teams played at their home stadium in their home city, and the third local derby after the Turin derby in 1938 and the Milan derby in 1977. Roma was officially declared the home team for this match. "Gangnam Style" singer Psy had a pregame performance, in which he was mercilessly booed.

Lazio won the match 1–0 with a goal by Senad Lulić in the 71st minute, a low right footed shot from a low cross from the right by Antonio Candreva after the goalkeeper Bogdan Lobonț failed to cut out the crossed ball.

Road to the final

Match

Details

References 

2013
1
Coppa Italia Final 2013
Coppa Italia Final 2013